Crustomollisia is a genus of fungi in the family Dermateaceae. This is a monotypic genus, containing the single species Crustomollisia roburnea.

See also
 List of Dermateaceae genera

References

External links
Crustomollisia at Index Fungorum

Dermateaceae genera
Monotypic Leotiomycetes genera